

Events 
Giacomo Carissimi becomes the chapelmaster at the Church of San Apollinare in the German-Hungarian College in Rome.
Ján Šimbracký buys a house in Spišské Podhradie.

Publications 
Paolo Agostini – Posthumous book of masses (Rome: Giovanni Battista Robletti)
Adriano Banchieri –  (Venice: Alessandro Vincenti), a collection of canzonettas for five voices and a theorbo
Ignazio Donati –  for two, three, four, and five voices (Venice: Alessandro Vincenti), a book of madrigals
Melchior Franck
 for eight voices (Coburg: Johann Forckel), a motet written for the jubilee held June 25–27, 1630
 for eight voices (Coburg: Johann Forckel), a Christmas motet
 (Coburg: Johann Forckel), incidental music for an oratorio performed in Coburg on June 14, 1630
Marco da Gagliano –  for four voices (Venice: Bartolomeo Magni)
Giovanni Girolamo Kapsberger
 (Rome: Paolo Masotti)
, vol. 2 (Rome: Paolo Masotti)
Martin Peerson – Mottects or grave chamber musique, containing songs of five parts of several sorts (London: William Stansby)

Classical music

Opera 
Claudio Monteverdi – Proserpina rapita

Births 
date unknown – Antonio Sartorio, composer (died 1680)
probable
Thomas Baltzar, violinist and composer (died 1663)
Hafız Post, Turkish composer (died 1694)
Susanna van Lee, Dutch actress and dancer (died 1700)

Deaths 
February 12 or 13 – Camillo Cortellini, composer, singer, and violinist (born 1561)
February 26 – William Brade, English composer, violinist and viol player (born 1560)
June (or later) – Alessandro Grandi, Italian composer (born 1590)
June 11 – Giovanni Francesco Anerio, Italian composer of oratorios (born c.1567)
June 29 – John Mundy, English organist and composer (born c. 1550)
September 7 – Giovanni Battista Fontana, composer (born 1589)
November 19 – Johann Hermann Schein, German composer (born 1586)
date unknown – Thomas Bateson, writer of madrigals (born 1570)
probable – Salamone Rossi, Venetian composer (born 1570)

References

 
Music
17th century in music
Music by year